Thijs Visser (born October 19, 1989) is an Aruban sailor. He competed at the 2016 Summer Olympics in the Nacra 17 race with Nicole van der Velden; the two placed 16th.

References

1989 births
Living people
Aruban male sailors (sport)
Olympic sailors of Aruba
Sailors at the 2016 Summer Olympics – Nacra 17
Place of birth missing (living people)